Viktor Ryashko may refer to:
 Viktor Ryashko (footballer) (born 1992), Ukrainian footballer
 Viktor Ryashko (football manager) (1964–2020), Ukrainian retired footballer and manager